Apomuria is a genus of flowering plants in the family Rubiaceae. It was described by Cornelis Eliza Bertus Bremekamp in 1963. The genus is endemic to Madagascar.

Species 

 Apomuria angustifolia Bremek.
 Apomuria biloba Bremek.
 Apomuria bullata Bremek.
 Apomuria crispulifolia Bremek.
 Apomuria falcata Bremek.
 Apomuria hymenodes Bremek.
 Apomuria melanosticta Bremek.
 Apomuria mollis Bremek.
 Apomuria moramangensis Bremek.
 Apomuria parvifolia Bremek.
 Apomuria penduliflora Bremek.
 Apomuria perrieri Bremek.

References

External links 
 Apomuria in the World Checklist of Rubiaceae

Rubiaceae genera
Psychotrieae